is a Japanese musician, bass guitarist, and record producer. He is a member of the J-pop band Dreams Come True, which was formed in 1988 and went on to sell over 50million CDs. He also composed the soundtracks for the video games Sonic the Hedgehog (1991) and Sonic the Hedgehog 2 (1992).

Career
Nakamura was originally a session musician before forming the "Cha-Cha & Audrey's Project" with Miwa Yoshida. In 1988, they formed the band Dreams Come True. In July 2002, he founded the record company "DCT Records" with Yoshida. They now serve as executive producers. Nakamura composes much of the catalog for Dreams Come True and arranges almost all of it.

On 22 June 2008, he married Mākii, the 21-year-old former lead vocalist of the Japanese rock band, High and Mighty Color.

Sonic the Hedgehog 
Nakamura was picked by Sega to compose the music for the original Sonic the Hedgehog early in 1990. Later that year on 7 November, the game was revealed for the first time by being painted on the side of Dream Come True's tour bus. He was also in the middle of recording the band's fourth album, Million Kisses during Sonic the Hedgehog, and their fifth album, The Swinging Star during Sonic the Hedgehog 2.

In 2006, Nakamura contributed a remixed version of the ending theme from Sonic the Hedgehog 2, "Sweet Sweet Sweet", for the 2006 game Sonic the Hedgehog.

In 2022, Nakamura voiced the Siberian champion in the Japanese dub of the Sonic the Hedgehog 2 film.

Other musical activity
He has also composed music for various television commercials

References

External links
 Masato Nakamura's blog
 Official Dreams Come True website

1958 births
Dreams Come True (band)
Japanese bass guitarists
Japanese composers
Japanese male composers
Japanese session musicians
Living people
Male bass guitarists
Musicians from Tokyo
Video game composers